Oakland Aviation Museum, formerly called Western Aerospace Museum, was founded in 1981 as a non-profit organization operating an aviation museum located at North Field of Oakland International Airport in Oakland, California.  It has over 30 vintage and modern airplanes, both civilian and military, and other displays that highlight noted aviators and innovators.

History 
The Oakland Aviation Museum was founded in 1981 as a non-profit organization under IRS Code 501 (C) 3 under the name of Western Aerospace Museum. The museum's first home was a small room at Hangar 5 at Oakland International Airport's historic North Field. 

In 1988, the museum was granted use of the historic Boeing School of Aeronautics hangar built in 1939. The hangar serves as the primary facility of the museum, providing indoor and outdoor exhibition space, aircraft restoration work areas, research library, and gift shop.  In 2007, Western Aerospace Museum was renamed Oakland Aviation Museum with the historical mission refocused on the important legacy of flight at North Field and the surrounding area.

Aircraft collection 
As of July 2022, the museum contains several original and reproductions of historic aircraft, including:

Wright EX Vin Fiz (replica)
1946 Aeronca 7AC Champion
Boeing Hybrid Dirigible (1/50th scale model)
ERCO Ercoupe 415 C
Glasair SH-II RG
Kitfox IV 1200
Jurca MJ-7 Gnatsum (P-51B  scale replica)
Short Solent Mk. III Flying Boat
Thorp/Paulic T3B-1
Kitty Hawk Flyer eVTOL
Cessna O-2A
Douglas KA-3B Skywarrior
Douglas NTA-4J Skyhawk
Grumman KA-6D Intruder
Vought A-7E Corsair II
TAV-8A Harrier
Hiller Ten99 (1099) Helicopter
Mikoyan Gurevich MiG-15bis
North American Aviation T-39 Saberliner
Grumman F-14 Tomcat
 McDonnell Aircraft ADM-20 Quail Cruise Missile
 JDT Mini-MAX 1600R EROS
 Rutan Long-EZ

Aircraft engines 
As of July 2022, the museum contains several aircraft engines on display, including:

Herring-Curtiss 4-stroke, 4-cylinder engine
Pratt and Whitney R-2800 twin-row 18-cylinder radial engine
General Electric J47 Turbojet
Wright R-3359 twin-row 18-cylinder cut-away radial engine
General Electric J79 Turbojet
Pancake V-8 circa 1940
Garrett GTP70 Gas Turbine
Allison T56 Series III Turboprop
Pratt & Whitney TF30-414A Turbofan
Pratt & Whitney R-985 Wasp Junior AN-1 9-cylinder air-cooled Radial Engine
Elizalde Tigre IV inverted 4-cylinder air-cooled (also known as a Tigre G-IV)
Lycoming R-680 9-cylinder air-cooled Radial Engine
Ranger V-770 inverted V-12 air-cooled
Righter O-45 2-cylinder air-cooled
Franklin O-200 (4AC-199) flat 4-cylinder air-cooled
McCulloch 4318A small flat 4-cylinder air-cooled
Heath-Henderson B-4 4-cylinder air-cooled
Galino-Taski 2-cylinder air-cooled glider engine
Andover V-32 2-cylinder APU

Exhibits 
The museum contains several galleries with exhibits, some of which emphasize the role Oakland and surrounding areas have played in the history of aviation.
Oakland Airport
Aircraft Engine Room
8th Air Force
General James Doolittle
US Navy Aviation
Tuskegee Airmen
Women in Aviation
Amelia Earhart
Transocean Air Lines
Legacy of World Airways
Trans International Airlines/Transamerica Airlines

Special events and tours 
Oakland Aviation Museum offers group tours of up to 30 people for schools, retirement communities or organizations. The museum hosts a number of special events including Open Cockpit Day. Groups can rent the museum for their own event.

References

External links

Official website

Aerospace museums in California
Museums in Oakland, California
Oakland International Airport